The Stadtwiki Karlsruhe is a city wiki of the German town Karlsruhe and its surroundings, which is the largest in the world.

History 
It was founded by the former pupil Hauke Löffler on 22 July 2004. The first version was running PmWiki; later the wiki was moved to MediaWiki.
It was mentioned by DPA and on German television (ZDF).

It is hosted by the voluntary association "Bildungsverein Region Karlsruhe e.V." (e.V. = Eingetragener Verein).

Content 
The Stadtwiki Karlsruhe contains information on all topics that are related to Karlsruhe, it provides detailed information and links to geography, nature, history, politics, religion, education, culture, social affairs, sports, business and transport.

It also provides information on the subject of tourism and leisure destinations, gastronomy guide, clubs and venues, and acts specifically as a calendar of events.

The only relevant criterion is the reference to Karlsruhe.

In October 2008 the Stadtwiki for an English and a French edition was expanded, in September 2009 at a Russian edition.

There are over 22.000 articles and 15.000 pictures by over 3000 authors.

License 
Content is availably under a Non-commercial Creative Commons license (by-nc-sa).

Notes

External links 
  German version
  English version

German online encyclopedias
Internet properties established in 2004
MediaWiki websites
Karlsruhe